China National Highway 306 (G306) runs northwest from Suizhong, Liaoning towards Hexigten Qi, Inner Mongolia and spans 497 kilometres.

Route and distance

See also 

 China National Highways

Transport in Liaoning
Transport in Inner Mongolia
306